Urho Johannes Julin (16 October 1928 – 27 May 2002) was a Finnish middle-distance runner. He competed in the men's 3000 metres steeplechase at the 1952 Summer Olympics.

References

1928 births
2002 deaths
Athletes (track and field) at the 1952 Summer Olympics
Finnish male middle-distance runners
Finnish male steeplechase runners
Olympic athletes of Finland
Place of birth missing